Habitation La Grivelière (Grivelière House) is a coffee plantation and coffeehouse in Vieux-Habitants, Basse-Terre, Guadeloupe, an overseas region of France. Founded in the late 17th century, it has been classified as a Monument historique since 1987. It operates under the auspices of Association Verte Vallée. One of the buildings has been re-purposed into a coffeehouse. It is one of the best preserved agricultural estates in the Lesser Antilles. Habitation La Grivelière contains a dozen buildings including a manor house, overseer's house, houses of permanent workers, two boucans, a roasting shed, mills, an oratory and five slave huts.

See also

Coffee production in Guadeloupe

References

Bibliography

External links

Monuments historiques of Guadeloupe